Carlos Reginald King (born October 2, 1979) is the CEO of television production company, Kingdom Reign Entertainment - which produces shows such as Belle Collective (2020), and Love & Marriage: Huntsville (2019) seen on the Oprah Winfrey Network (OWN), Hollywood Divas and The Next :15 on TV One, Selling It: In the ATL on WeTV and My Super Sweet 16 featuring Lil Wayne and Reginae on MTV. Additionally, Carlos has executive produced four seasons of Bravo's hit show The Real Housewives of Atlanta (Seasons 6, 7, 8 and 9), The Real Housewives of Atlanta: Kandi's Wedding, I Dream of NeNe: The Wedding - all on Bravo. King has also co-executive produced Love & Hip Hop: Atlanta on VH1, Don't be Tardy for the Wedding on Bravo, and as a producer on Season 25: Oprah Behind The Scenes for the OWN network and seasons 1 and 2 of The Real Housewives of New Jersey on Bravo.

King's work has transitioned from behind-the-scenes to in front of the camera with many television appearances including hosting the reunion shows for Hollywood Divas and The Next :15. Additional appearances include HLN, VH1, TV One among others. More recently, he signed a first look deal with OWN: Oprah Winfrey Network.

Education
Before his sophomore year at Wayne State University ended, the Detroit native decided to transfer to Hunter College to pursue a bachelor's degree in mass communications.

References

Wayne State University alumni
Hunter College alumni
1979 births
Living people
People from Detroit
African-American actors
21st-century African-American people
20th-century African-American people
LGBT producers
LGBT African Americans